Varsan (also Romanized as Varsān) is a village in Mazraeh Now Rural District, in the Central District of Ashtian County, Markazi Province, Iran. At the 2006 census, its population was 128, in 51 families.

References 

Populated places in Ashtian County